The VI Memorial of Hubert Jerzy Wagner was held in Poland from 16 to 18 May 2008. 4 teams participated in the tournament. It was also qualification tournament to European Championship 2009 held in Turkey.

Qualification
All teams except the host must receive an invitation from the organizers.

Squads

Venue

Results
All times are Central European Summer Time (UTC+02:00).

Final standing

Awards
MVP:  Mariusz Wlazły
Best Spiker:  Mariusz Wlazły
Best Scorer:  Miloš Ćulafić
Best Blocker:  Daniel Pliński
Best Server:  Mariusz Wlazły
Best Setter:  Paweł Woicki
Best Receiver  Marcin Wika
Best Libero:  Sten Esna

References

External links
 Official website

Memorial of Hubert Jerzy Wagner
Memorial of Hubert Jerzy Wagner
Memorial of Hubert Jerzy Wagner